Streptomyces niveoruber is a bacterium species from the genus of Streptomyces which was isolated from soil from Grimsby in England. Streptomyces niveoruber produces cinerubin.

See also 
 List of Streptomyces species

References

Further reading

External links
Type strain of Streptomyces niveoruber at BacDive -  the Bacterial Diversity Metadatabase	

niveoruber
Bacteria described in 1958